Helmer Orlaf Leif Pedersen (28 March 1930 in Copenhagen, Denmark – 24 August 1987) was an Olympic gold medallist for New Zealand in yachting. With Earle Wells, Pedersen won the Flying Dutchman class at the 1964 Summer Olympics in Tokyo. Pedersen had previously been the reserve for the same class at the 1960 Summer Olympics in Rome.

In his home country of Denmark he had been mainly a Finn class yachtsman. He did not make any Danish Olympic team due to the presence of the great Paul Elvstrøm, although he was a reserve for Denmark at the 1952 Summer Olympics in Finland.

He died in 1987 from lung cancer after having been a heavy smoker. He was retrospectively inducted into the New Zealand Sports Hall of Fame in 1990.

References

External links
 
 
 

1930 births
1987 deaths
Danish male sailors (sport)
New Zealand male sailors (sport)
Olympic gold medalists for New Zealand in sailing
Sailors at the 1964 Summer Olympics – Flying Dutchman
Deaths from cancer in New Zealand
Deaths from lung cancer
Medalists at the 1964 Summer Olympics
Sportspeople from Copenhagen